Prystrunky is a term used for the additional unfretted strings strung across the body of Ukrainian folk instruments such as the kobza, bandura, and torban. Prystrunky means "near the strings". These additional strings are thought to have appeared on these instruments as early as the 17th century. Others feel that these additional strings appeared later in the mid to late 18th century. On the contemporary bandura they are now the main strings on which the performer plays, and are similar to the super treble strings on a harp guitar.

Bibliography
 Diakowsky, M. J. - The Bandura. The Ukrainian Trend, 1958, №I,  - С.18-36
 Diakowsky, M. – Anyone can make a bandura – I did.  The Ukrainian Trend, Volume 6
 Haydamaka, L. – Kobza-bandura – National Ukrainian Musical Instrument. "Guitar Review" №33, Summer 1970 (С.13-18)
 Mishalow, V. - A Short History of the Bandura. East European Meetings in Ethnomusicology 1999, Romanian Society for Ethnomusicology, Volume 6, - С.69-86
 Mizynec, V. - Folk Instruments of Ukraine. Bayda Books, Melbourne, Australia, 1987 - 48с.

Kobzarstvo
String instrument construction

History of musical instruments